Collin Dean (born January 8, 2005) is an American actor.

Personal life
Collin hails from Gilbert, Arizona, and he has an older sister named Michaela.

Career

Voice acting
Dean was the voice of Lincoln Loud in the Nickelodeon animated series, The Loud House after replacing Grant Palmer in 2016. Collin Dean is also known for guest starring in the Cartoon Network animated series Adventure Time as "Tiffany," and for his background role in Hotel Transylvania. Dean also had a minor role as one of the campers in the American Dad! episode, Camp Campawanda, and co-starred with Elijah Wood in the 2014 Cartoon Network miniseries Over the Garden Wall.

Live-action acting
In 2012, he was cast as Todd in the Funny or Die short film, Will Ferrell & Zach Galifianakis Debate Children.

In 2015, he appeared as Ruprecht the Elf, in the comedy horror Christmas film, Krampus.

Filmography

Film

Television

References

External links
 
 

2005 births
Living people
American male child actors
American male voice actors
Place of birth missing (living people)
People from Gilbert, Arizona